Thomas or Tom Howard may refer to:

Nobility and politicians

Thomas Howard, 2nd Duke of Norfolk (1443–1524), English soldier and statesman
Thomas Howard, 3rd Duke of Norfolk (1473–1554), prominent Tudor politician
Lord Thomas Howard (1511-1537), a younger son of the 2nd Duke of Norfolk, half brother of the 3rd Duke, chiefly known for his marriage to Henry VIII's niece, Margaret Douglas
Thomas Howard, 4th Duke of Norfolk (1536–1572), English nobleman
Thomas Howard, 5th Duke of Norfolk (1627–1677), English nobleman
Thomas Howard, 8th Duke of Norfolk (1683–1732), son of Lord Thomas Howard and Mary Elizabeth Savile
Thomas Howard, 14th Earl of Arundel (1586–1646), English courtier during the reigns of King James I and King Charles I
Thomas Howard, 1st Earl of Berkshire (1587–1669), second son of Thomas Howard, 1st Earl of Suffolk and Catherine Knyvet
Thomas Howard, 3rd Earl of Berkshire (1619–1706), English peer
Thomas Howard, 2nd Earl of Effingham (1714–1763), British nobleman and Army officer
Thomas Howard, 1st Earl of Suffolk (1561–1626), son of Thomas Howard, 4th Duke of Norfolk by his second wife Margaret Audley
Thomas Howard (English MP) (died 1682), MP for Haverfordwest
Thomas Howard, 3rd Earl of Effingham (1746–1791), British nobleman and Army officer
Thomas Howard, 14th Earl of Suffolk (1721–1783), British peer and politician
Thomas Howard, 16th Earl of Suffolk (1776–1851), British peer and politician
Thomas Howard (1651–1701), Teller of the Exchequer and Member of Parliament
Thomas Howard (Manitoba politician) (1845–1903), political figure in Manitoba
Tom Howard (Australian politician) (1880–1949), Australian politician
Tom Howard (British politician) (1888–1953), British Member of Parliament for Islington South
Thomas Howard, 3rd Viscount Howard of Bindon (died 1611), English peer and politician
Thomas Howard, 1st Viscount Howard of Bindon (c. 1520–1582), English peer and politician

Sport
Thomas Howard (American football) (1983–2013), American football linebacker
Thomas Howard (baseball) (born 1964), former outfielder in Major League Baseball
Thomas Howard (English cricketer) (1781–1864), English professional cricketer who played first-class cricket
Thomas Howard (Australian cricketer) (1877–1965), Australian cricketer
Thomas Howard Sr. (born 1954), former American football linebacker who played nine seasons
Thomas Albert Howard, professor of history
Thomas Howard, pseudonym used by the outlaw Jesse James
Tom Howard (golfer) (1888–1967), Australian professional golfer
Tom Howard (runner) (born 1948), Canadian Olympic runner
Tom Howard (wrestler) (born 1969), American professional wrestler, mixed martial artist, kickboxer and actor
Tom Howard (ice hockey) (1871–1945), Canadian ice hockey player
Tom Howard (hurler) (born 1962), Irish hurler
Tommy Howard, Irish referee, see 1993 All-Ireland Senior Football Championship Final

Other
Thomas Howard (British Army officer, born 1684) (1684–1753), commander of the Buffs
Thomas Howard (pirate) (fl. 1698–1703), pirate primarily active in the Indian Ocean and the Red Sea during the Golden Age of Piracy
T. Henry Howard (1849–1923), second Chief of the Staff of The Salvation Army
Thomas B. Howard (1854–1920), U.S. Navy admiral
Thomas H. Howard (1862–1904), American socialite
Tom Howard (comedian) (1885–1955), Irish comedian, creator and host of It Pays to Be Ignorant
Tom Howard (photographer) (1894–1961), photographer who worked at the Washington bureau of P&A Photographs during the 1920s
Tom Howard (special effects) (1910–1985), British special effects artist
Tom Howard (attorney) (1917–1965), American attorney who represented Jack Ruby, the killer of Lee Harvey Oswald
Tom Howard (musician) (1950–2010), American pianist, musical arranger and orchestral conductor

See also